Melochia is a genus of flowering plants in the mallow family, Malvaceae. It comprises 54 species from the tropical and subtropical regions of the world, ranging from India eastwards through Malesia and the Pacific Islands to the Americas and the Caribbean.

Some taxonomy books have placed genus Melochia in family Sterculiaceae, but Sterculiaceae is now generally considered obsolete as a taxonomic class.

The name "Melochia" comes from the Arabic name Mulukhiyah which in Arabic means mallow plants of the genus Corchorus (including Corchorus olitorius) which are cultivated as vegetables in Egypt (and elsewhere). The take-up of this Arabic Molokheya as a label for the Melochia mallow plants began with the Latin botanist Prospero Alpini (died 1617), who spent several years in Egypt in the 1580s, and Alpini's name was soon adopted by the botanists Johann Bauhin (died 1613), Caspar Bauhin (died 1624), and Johann Vesling (visited Egypt 1628; died 1649).

Selected species
 Melochia arborea
 Melochia caracasana
 Melochia carrioni
 Melochia chamaedrys
 Melochia corchorifolia L.
 Melochia hermannioides
 Melochia makateaensis
 Melochia manducata
 Melochia nodiflora Sw.
 Melochia odorata
 Melochia parvifolia
 Melochia pilosa
 Melochia pyramidata L.
 Melochia spicata
 Melochia tomentosa L.
 Melochia umbellata (Houtt.) Stapf
 Melochia villosa
 Melochia villosissima (C.Presl) Merr. – endemic to western Micronesian islands
 Melochia vitiensis

Formerly placed here
Sida cordata (Burm.f.) Borss.Waalk. (as M. cordata Burm.f.)

References

Notes

Byttnerioideae
Malvaceae genera